The Estate is a 2022 black comedy written and directed by Dean Craig. It stars Toni Collette and Anna Faris as sisters who try to get back in the good graces of their estranged aunt before she passes to inherit some of her fortune.  The film was released on November 4, 2022, by Signature Entertainment.

Premise 
Macey and Savannah are sisters and business partners struggling to keep their business afloat when they learn that their wealthy estranged Aunt Hilda has terminal cancer.  The sisters immediately set out to visit Hilda to get in her good graces and inherit some of her fortune.  When they arrive, they learn that several of their cousins have also had the same idea, and now the family is competing for Aunt Hilda's affection.

Cast 
 Toni Collette as Macey
 Anna Faris as Savannah
 David Duchovny as Richard
 Rosemarie DeWitt as Beatrice
 Kathleen Turner as Aunt Hilda
 Ron Livingston as James
 Keyla Monterroso Mejia as Ellen
 Danny Vinson as Bill

Production 
Signature and Capstone announced that Dean Craig was writing and directing The Estate in December 2021, and Toni Collette and Anna Faris would star in the film along. In the following months, Kathleen Turner, Rosemarie DeWitt, Keyla Monterroso Mejia, David Duchovny, and Ron Livingston joined the cast.

Filming took place in New Orleans between February and March 2022.

Release and reception
Signature released the film to limited theaters on November 4, 2022. It released on DVD on January 10, 2023.

References

External links 
 
 

2022 comedy films
2020s English-language films
Films shot in New Orleans
Films about siblings
Films about inheritances